The Catholic University of Mozambique (UCM) is a university in Mozambique.

The university was founded on 10 August 1996 by the Mozambican conference of Bishops. At the time, higher education in Mozambique was only available in the capital, Maputo. The university currently has locations in Beira, Chimoio, Cuamba, Nampula, Pemba, Quelimane and Tete. One of the intentions was to make higher education available to central and northern Mozambique. , approximately 3,270 students were enrolled at the university. The rector is Prof. Dr. Padre Alberto Ferreira.

History
The initiative to create the Catholic University of Mozambique (UCM) came up during the peace negotiations in Rome between Frelimo and Renamo. In June 1992 the negotiations were deadlocked; to unblock them, the mediator, Dom Jaime Pedro Gonçalves, Archbishop of Beira, presented the idea to establish a quality university for the centre and north of Mozambique. The Catholic Church promised to correct the unequal structure of the concentration of higher education institutions in Maputo. Subsequently, this led to the signing of the peace agreement on October 4, 1992 between Frelimo and Renamo.

The Catholic University of Mozambique was established as a contribution to peace and reconciliation, as an institutional compromise, and was officially founded in 1995 (Boletim da República, Decreto N° 43/95, September 14). In August 1996 UCM opened its first faculties in Beira and Nampula.

Enrolment

From 2000 onwards, there has been an exponential increase in student enrolment. In 2000, UCM had an enrolment of 50 students; by 2005 this had increased to 405 students, and by 2008 UCM had an enrolment of 4497 students. To date over 7,000 students have graduated from UCM and the number is anticipated to continue increasing at an exponential rate as observed in these previous years. Table 1 summarises student enrolment at UCM from 2000 to 2008.

The number of female students has always been consistently lower than the number of male counterparts. On average, UCM has had 36% female students and 64% male students.

Institutional structure and management
UCM is involved in the national framework of governance and administration for higher education institutions and belongs to the Episcopal Conference of Mozambique. UCM is governed by the chancellor, the Archbishop of Beira, the rector, the vice-rector for finance and administration and secretary general, and the vice-rector for academic affairs and development.

UCM currently has six faculties in four provinces:
Faculty of Economics and Management (Beira)
Faculty of Law (Nampula)
Faculty of Education and Communication (Nampula)
Faculty of Agriculture (Cuamba)
Faculty of Health Sciences (Beira)
Faculty of Tourism Management and Information Technology (Pemba)

To date UCM has established research centres in Nampula (Konrad Adenauer Research Centre), Beira (Centre for Geographic Information, GEA-Consult, Medical Research Centre) and Chimoio (Study and Research Centre), as well as a distance education centre (Beira) for teacher education. As part of UCM's strategy to bring higher education to the people, it opened faculty delegations in Chimoio (Economics, Law), Nampula (Economics), Beira (Information Technology), Tete (Economics) and Quelimane (Information Technology and Law).

Each faculty has a faculty board composed of the dean, pedagogic director and administrator. Centres only have directors. In the rectory office there is the rector, vice rector finance and administration, academic affairs and development, human resources department and public relations department.

Finances
As a private institution, UCM is funded by tuition fees, paid by its students, their families and sometimes by private and public scholarships. In 2008, tuition fees for a three-year bachelor program was fixed at an equivalent of US$1,200, tuition fees for an additional year to obtain a Bachelor of Honour’s degree are at US$1,500, same as the annual tuition fees for the medicine faculty.

References

External links
 Official website 

Universities in Mozambique
Catholic universities and colleges in Mozambique
Educational institutions established in 1996
1996 establishments in Mozambique